Siddha, Nepal may refer to:

Siddha, Gandaki
Siddha, Janakpur